Timothy Paul (secular name Timothy Baymon) is the first Patriarch of the Holy Communion of Churches (also known as the Holy Christian Orthodox Church), a Christian denomination embracing the Convergence Movement. Serving a third consecutive term as President of the World Bishops Council, an ecumenical body of Christian churches and their prelates, he also became senior pastor of the Christian Cathedral in Springfield, Massachusetts.

Biography 
Archbishop Timothy was born in Springfield, Massachusetts. He was reared in the Church of God in Christ.

Archbishop Timothy has served in various community boards. Timothy Paul joined the New England Partners in Faith and served two terms as President of the Council of Churches of Western Massachusetts.

In 2003, Archbishop Timothy and the World Bishops Council denounced universalism and in one case publicly criticized the teachings of Bishop Carlton Pearson, which the Council judged to be heretical.

In 2004 Paul signed a letter with twenty-eight other religious leaders in support of religious freedom in Iraq. Representing the World Bishops Council at the United Nations 60th DPI/NGO Conference, Paul urged Christians to "become greater stewards of the earth" by conserving energy, by reducing greenhouse gases and deforestation, and by creating public and private partnerships which will lead to renewable energy sources.

Archbishop Timothy founded Epiphany Development Corporation which in 2006 announced the planned construction of a $10 million boutique hotel at the Epiphany Tower building on State Street in that city. In 2017, Timothy and the Holy Communion of Churches filed a lawsuit against the Epiphany Tower owner. In 2018 the hotel planned by Timothy and his church opened.

Holy Communion of Churches 
The Holy Communion of Churches is a predominantly Black Christian denomination established in the United States of America. As part of the Convergence Movement, it gleams toward Eastern Christianity and Pentecostalism, and ordains women to the presbyterate and episcopate—a practice deemed heretical and uncanonical by the mainstream Eastern Orthodox Church and Eastern Catholic Churches in union with Rome.

References

External links
The World Bishops Council
Holy Communion of Churches

African-American Christian clergy
21st-century archbishops
Wheaton College (Illinois) alumni
Living people
Convergence Movement
Year of birth missing (living people)